David Roger Bull  (born September 1957) is an English engineer and professor at the University of Bristol. He was named a Fellow of the Institute of Electrical and Electronics Engineers (IEE) in 2013 for contributions in video analysis, compression and communications.

References 

Fellow Members of the IEEE
Living people
1957 births